Bill Cronin is a former American football coach. He is served as the head football coach at Georgetown College in Georgetown, Kentucky from 1997 to 2021, compiling a record of 218–65. Cronin led the Georgetown Tigers to consecutive NAIA Football National Championships in 2000 and 2001.

Cronin was an assistant football coach at Georgetown for 11 seasons, from 1982 to 1992, under Kevin Donley. He then served as the head football coach at Madison Central High School in Richmond, Kentucky from 1993 to 1996.

Cronin retired after the 2021 was season and was succeeded by Chris Oliver.

Head coaching record

College

See also
 List of college football coaches with 200 wins

References

Year of birth missing (living people)
Living people
Anderson Ravens football coaches
Georgetown Tigers football coaches
High school football coaches in Kentucky